Tyler Michael Danish (born September 12, 1994) is an American professional baseball pitcher in the New York Yankees organization. He has previously played in Major League Baseball (MLB) for the Chicago White Sox and Boston Red Sox.

Career
Danish attended Durant High School in Plant City, Florida. As a senior in 2013, he did not allow an earned run in 94 innings pitched. In addition to his 0.00 earned run average (ERA), he registered 156 strikeouts, one of the five best high school hurlers in the nation that year. Danish was drafted by the Chicago White Sox in the second round of the 2013 MLB draft.

Chicago White Sox
Danish made his professional debut in 2013 with the Bristol White Sox. He finished the season with the Kannapolis Intimidators. That year, Baseball America named him "Closest to the Majors" along with pitcher Brad Goldberg. Danish started 2014 back with Kannapolis. After posting a 0.71 ERA in seven starts, he was promoted to the Winston-Salem Dash.

Danish began the 2016 season with the Double-A Birmingham Barons. On June 9, Danish was promoted to play for the major-league White Sox for the first time. In his MLB debut, Danish pitched two-thirds of an inning against the Kansas City Royals on June 11, where he gave up one earned run on three hits. Danish pitched in two more games, on consecutive days, compiling a 10.80 ERA in  innings pitched with the White Sox. On June 14, he was optioned to the White Sox' Triple-A affiliate, the Charlotte Knights of the International League. In five starts with the Knights, Danish posted a 1–3 record with a 5.83 ERA and 21 strikeouts in  innings pitched.

In 2017, Danish made a single appearance with the White Sox, serving as the 26th man on the roster and starting the first game of a doubleheader against the Detroit Tigers on May 27. In his first major league start, Danish also received his first decision, a win, by pitching five shutout innings en route to a 3–0 Chicago victory; he struck out six batters while allowing three hits. A day later, Danish was optioned back to Charlotte.

Danish began the 2018 season with Charlotte before he was promoted to the major leagues on July 27. In seven appearances with the White Sox, he recorded one win along with a 7.11 ERA while striking out five batters in  innings. He elected free agency on October 2, 2018. Overall in parts of three seasons with the White Sox, Danish made 11 MLB appearances, registering a 2–0 record with 4.85 ERA while striking out 11 batters in 13 innings pitched.

2019–2021 seasons
On December 18, 2018, Danish signed a minor-league contract with the Seattle Mariners. In six appearances (four starts) with the Tacoma Rainiers of the Pacific Coast League, he had an 0–4 record with a 21.26 ERA. He was released on May 24, 2019.

On June 19, 2019, Danish signed with the New Britain Bees of the Atlantic League of Professional Baseball, an independent baseball league. In 19 relief appearances, he pitched to a 4–2 record with a 6.08 ERA. He became a free agent after the season.

On April 4, 2020, Danish signed with the Sussex County Miners of the independent Frontier League. On August 5, 2020, Danish signed with the Sioux Falls Canaries of the American Association. In seven appearances (six starts) with Sioux Falls, he had a 4–0 record with a 2.13 ERA. On October 27, 2020, Danish was returned to Sussex County.

On May 19, 2021, before the start of the Frontier League season, Danish signed a minor league contract with the Los Angeles Angels organization. In 32 total appearances, mostly in relief and primarily at the Triple-A level, he had a 5–3 record with a 3.84 ERA while striking out 79 batters in  innings pitched.

Boston Red Sox
On February 20, 2022, Danish signed a minor-league deal with the Boston Red Sox, including an invitation to major-league spring training. On April 4, the team selected his contract from the Triple-A Worcester Red Sox, adding him to Boston's 40-man roster. He was returned to Worcester on April 29 and removed from the 40-man roster. He was recalled to Boston on May 8, when Michael Wacha was placed on the injured list. On July 7, Danish was placed on the injured list due to a right forearm strain. On August 28, he was activated and optioned back to Triple-A. Danish was recalled to Boston on September 2, when Zack Kelly was placed on the paternity list, and returned to Worcester on October 1. In 32 relief appearances with Boston during 2022, Danish compiled a 3–1 record with 5.13 ERA while striking out 32 batters in  innings. On October 31, Danish elected minor-league free agency, after being placed on waivers and removed from the 40-man roster by the Red Sox.

New York Yankees 
On December, 29, 2022, Danish signed a minor league contract with the New York Yankees, with an invitation to spring training.

Personal
Danish's father, who was serving time in prison for fraud, died of cancer in 2010.

References

External links

1994 births
Living people
People from Valrico, Florida
Baseball players from Florida
Major League Baseball pitchers
Chicago White Sox players
Boston Red Sox players
Bristol White Sox players
Kannapolis Intimidators players
Winston-Salem Dash players
Birmingham Barons players
Charlotte Knights players
Tacoma Rainiers players
New Britain Bees players
Sioux Falls Canaries players
Rocket City Trash Pandas players
Salt Lake Bees players
Worcester Red Sox players
Sportspeople from Hillsborough County, Florida
Durant High School (Florida) alumni